On May 8, 1822, the last day of the First Session of the 17th Congress, Henry Baldwin (DR) of  resigned from Congress.  A special election was held on October 1, 1822 to fill the resulting vacancy.

Election results

Forward took his seat on December 2, 1822

See also
List of special elections to the United States House of Representatives

References

Pennsylvania 1822 14
Pennsylvania 1822 14
1822 14
Pennsylvania 14
United States House of Representatives 14
United States House of Representatives 1822 14